Events from the year 1590 in Ireland.

Incumbent
Monarch: Elizabeth I

Events
January 14- Sir William FitzWilliam, acting for the Lord Deputy, concludes his campaign against rebels in Connacht.
Spring - Sir Richard Bingham, President of Connacht, occupies West Bréifne and the hereditary lord, Brian O'Rourke, flees; later this year the adjacent territory of Monaghan is seized by the crown after the execution at law of the resident lord, Aodh Rua Mac Mathúna.
 September 3- As part of the O'Donnell Succession dispute the Battle of Doire Leathan is fought in County Donegal. Sir Donnell O'Donnell, one of the leading claimants to the title, is defeated and killed by forces backing his half-brother and rival Hugh Roe O'Donnell.

Births
Thomas Carve, historian (d. 1672?)
John de Burgh, Roman Catholic Archbishop of Tuam (d. 1667)
Owen Roe O'Neill, soldier (d. 1649)
Approximate date - Mícheál Ó Cléirigh, chronicler; chief author of the Annals of the Four Masters (d. 1643)

Deaths
March - Elizabeth Clinton, Countess of Lincoln, noblewoman (b. 1527)
August 5 - Maol Muire Ó hÚigínn, Roman Catholic Archbishop of Tuam.
Thomas Fitzmaurice, 16th Baron Kerry.
Sorley Boy MacDonnell, established the MacDonnell clan in County Antrim, resisted attempts by Shane O'Neill and the English to expel them (b. c.1505)

References

 
1590s in Ireland
Ireland